Eugene S. Clarke (born April 4, 1956) is a Republican former member of the Mississippi State Senate who resides in Hollandale in Washington County in western Mississippi.

Early life
Clarke was born in Greenville, Mississippi. He graduated from Mississippi State University at Starkville, at which he was a member of the Sigma Alpha Epsilon fraternity.

Personal life
An accountant, Clarke is married to the former Paula Watkins. They have three children. He is a Methodist.

References

External links

1956 births
Living people
Politicians from Greenville, Mississippi
Mississippi State University alumni
Businesspeople from Mississippi
Republican Party Mississippi state senators
21st-century American politicians
People from Hollandale, Mississippi
Methodists from Mississippi